Pratham Mysore is a non-profit organization based in Mysore, Karnataka state, India.

Activities
During 2002, Pratham began working with two slum schools in Mysore district. Very soon, the service of Pratham Mysore was extended to over 800 government schools. Most of these are located in remote villages of Karnataka state.

In 2015, Pratham launched a campaign to reach 6,000 villages of Karnataka spread over 30 districts.

Partnerships
Pratham collaborates with other NGOs, communities and people of like-minded attitude.

Programmes
 Kindergarten schools
 Read India programme
 'Model Village' initiative
 Scholarships to poor students
 Science Workshops
 Career Support

Mysore offices
Pratham's Mysore headquarters is located on Temple Road in Jayalakshmipuram, Mysore. Pratham Activity and Resource Center is located in Mathrumandali Circle, Vontikoppal, Mysore.

References

Organisations based in Mysore
2002 establishments in Karnataka
Organizations established in 2002